Annabathula Akash (born 23 October 1991) is an Indian cricketer who plays for Hyderabad. He made his Twenty20 debut on 6 January 2016 in the 2015–16 Syed Mushtaq Ali Trophy.

References

External links
 

1991 births
Living people
Indian cricketers
Hyderabad cricketers
Cricketers from Hyderabad, India